"Regarding Margie" is the twentieth episode of the seventeenth season of the American animated television series The Simpsons. It originally aired on the Fox network in the United States on May 7, 2006. In this episode, Marge gets amnesia and fails to remember Homer.

Plot 
To earn money, Bart and his friends Milhouse and Nelson go around the neighborhood spray-painting people's addresses on their curbs and making them pay for the unsolicited service. This works on Moe and Ned Flanders, but when Homer does not pay them, they leave with only the first two digits painted. The following day, a mail carrier brings Homer and Marge the wrong mail after reading their curb. Homer receives steaks and an invitation to a wedding, while Marge gets a letter claiming that she has won a contest, with the prize being a maid cleaning her house for a day. Fearing that she will be judged for having a dirty house, Marge cleans until it is spotless, except for a small stain on the kitchen floor. She combines all of her different cleaners, but passes out from the fumes and hits her head on a stool.

Marge wakes up in the hospital and is told that she has amnesia, and does not remember her family. When she returns home, the environment quickly jogs her memory of her children, in addition to Flanders and Milhouse. Homer is still a stranger to her due to her mind blocking out an unpleasant memory. Homer tries to remind Marge who he is, but she is disturbed and disgusted instead and forces him out of the house.

Patty and Selma take Marge to a speed dating event, and she meets a man who shares her interests. When Marge tells him that she has amnesia and three kids, he immediately leaves. Homer scolds the man for leaving her, saying that she is the most beautiful woman he will ever meet. Marge tells Homer that even though she may not remember him, he knows the most wonderful things about her. As they drive back home, Homer mentions beer, and she suddenly remembers him through his alcoholic tendencies.

References

External links 
 

The Simpsons (season 17) episodes
2006 American television episodes
Television episodes about amnesia
Cultural depictions of George W. Bush